Barlavento is the western region of the Algarve, comprising the municipalities of Albufeira, Aljezur, Lagoa, Lagos, Monchique, Portimão, Silves and Vila do Bispo.

See also
 Sotavento Algarvio

References

Algarve